Chinglen Nongdrenkhomba  (1788–1834), also known as Raja Gambhir Singh, was a ruler of the Manipur Kingdom.

Biography
He was a son of Chingthang Khomba. He succeeded his nephew Yumjaotaba in April 1821 during the seven years devastation. He abdicated the throne with the arrival of a Burmese force under his cousin Prince Jai Singh, the first puppet king of Manipur under Burmese suzerainty, in October 1821. Gambhir Singh fled to Cachar.

In Cachar, Gambhir Singh with the help of his elder brothers Chourjit and Marjit dethroned Govinda Chandra, the king of Cachar. Govinda Chandra applied for the protection of the British East India Company. His request was refused. In consequence of which he applied to the King of Burma to reinstate him. Accordingly, in 1823 the king of Burma send a large army into Cachar from to arrest Chourjit, Marjit and Gambhir Singh.  The Burmese forces proceeded up to the territory of British East India Company. In March 1824, Lord Amherst, the then Governor General of British India declared war against Burma. In 1823, the British Government opened communications with Gambhir Singh; upon which 500 Meiteis under his command were taken into pay of the British Government, and co-operated with the British troops in driving out the Burmese out of Cachar.  This force of 500 men was known as Gambhir Singh Levy (later Manipur Levy). The Manipur Levy under Gambhir Singh and his second cousin Nara Singh, later Maharaja Nara Singh, played a key role in driving out the Burmese from cachar and Manipur. The First Anglo-Burmese War was ended with the defeat of the Burmese. A peace treaty was signed between the Burmese and the British on 24 February 1826 known as the Treaty of Yandaboo. According to the article no.2 of the Treaty Gambhir Singh was declared the independent ruler of Manipur.  Gambhir Singh reigned until his death on 9 January 1834. He was succeeded by his infant son Chandra Kirti with Maharaja Nara Singh as regent.

The Khaki Ngamba mentions that on a Monday in either April or May 1829, Singh was passing through Sylhet whilst on a British expedition against the Khasis. Two processions were being prepared by Sylhet's Muslim and Hindu communities respectively. The Islamic month of Muharram in the history of Sylhet was a lively time during which tazia processions were common. This happened to fall on the same day as the Hindu festival of Rothjatra. Sensing possible communal violence, the Faujdar of Sylhet, Ganar Khan, ordered the Hindu community to delay their festival by one day. Contrary to the Nawab's order, a riot emerged between the two communities. As a Hindu himself, Singh managed to defend the Hindus and disperse the Muslim rioters with his Manipuri troops. The Rothjatra was not delayed, and Singh stayed to take part in it. Revered by the Hindu community as a defender of their faith, he enjoyed the procession and initiated the practice of celebrating Rothjatra and worshipping Jagannath in his own homeland of Manipur.

See also
List of Manipuri kings
Manipur (princely state)

References

External links
Modern Era - IIT Guwahati
 Frontline - 9 September 2005

Meitei royalty
Hindu monarchs
1789 births
1829 deaths